Eric Magloire Bassombeng (born 11 March 1983) is a Cameroonian footballer who plays as a midfielder. He is a free agent and his latest club was GAIS.

References

External links
 
 
 

1983 births
Living people
Cameroonian footballers
Allsvenskan players
Örebro SK players
GAIS players
Cameroonian expatriate footballers
Expatriate footballers in Sweden
Les Astres players
Association football midfielders